Simona Halep was the defending champion, but chose not to participate this year.

Irina-Camelia Begu won the title, defeating Julia Görges in the final, 6–3, 7–5.

Seeds

Draw

Finals

Top half

Bottom half

Qualifying

Seeds

Qualifiers

Lucky loser

Draw

First qualifier

Second qualifier

Third qualifier

Fourth qualifier

References
Main Draw
Qualifying Draw

BRD Bucharest Openandnbsp;- Singles
2017 Singles